The history of the Jews in Venezuela dates to the middle of the 17th century, when records suggest that groups of marranos (Spanish and Portuguese descendants of baptized Jews suspected of secret adherence to Judaism) lived in Tucacas, Caracas and Maracaibo. The Jewish community, however, did not become established in Venezuela until the middle of the 19th century. Since Hugo Chávez took power in 1999, tension has existed between the government and Jewish population, which has seen large numbers emigrating. Today, the majority of Venezuelan Jews live in Israel, while modern-day Venezuela continues to host a modest Jewish population.

19th century

At the turn of the 19th century, Venezuela was fighting against the Spanish Empire in wars of independence and Simón Bolívar, celebrated as Venezuela's liberator, found refuge and material support for his army in the homes of Jews from Curaçao. The Jewish Cemetery of Coro is the oldest Jewish cemetery in continuous use in the Americas. Its origin can be located in the 19th century, when Sephardic Jews from the Dutch colony of Curaçao began to migrate to the Venezuelan city of Santa Ana de Coro in 1824. Unfortunately, twenty-eight years later, a violent act of anti-Semitism meant that the entire Coro Jewish population of 168 individuals was expelled by govern back to Curacao.

20th century 
 
Prior to their arrival, the Venezuelan Navy had repeatedly checked Dutch and Antillean merchant ships and the presence of the Dutch warships acted as a deterrent against further actions.

In 1907, the Israelite Beneficial Society, which became the Israelite Association of Venezuela in 1919, was created as an organization to bring the Jews who were scattered throughout the country together. Jewish prayer and holiday services took place in small houses in Caracas and towns like Los Teques and La Guaira. By 1917, the number of Jewish citizens rose to 475, and to 882 in 1926. In the 1920s and 1930s, the Jewish community began to develop with the arrival of North African and eastern European Jews.  Jewish immigration from Eastern and Central Europe increased after 1934 but, by then, Venezuela had imposed specific restrictions on Jewish immigration, which remained in effect until after the 1950s.
 
In 1939 the steamboats Koenigstein and Caribia left Nazi Germany and docked in Venezuela. One Jewish refugee commented in the Venezuelan newspaper, La Esfera, "Imagine our joy at being free and far from a land in which everything threatened us with death. It is such a holy occurrence given that we were expelled from Germany and you have embraced us."  By 1950, in spite of immigration restrictions, there were around 6,000 Jewish people in Venezuela.  The biggest waves of immigration occurred after World War II and the 1967 Six-Day War, when a large influx of Sephardi Jews from Morocco arrived and settled mostly in the capital of Caracas.  Coinciding with that very influx, in the mid-60’s the first Chabad representative moved to the country, in order to service the many Jews who had made Venezuela their home. The Jewish population in Venezuela peaked at 45,000, largely centered in Caracas, but with smaller concentrations in Maracaibo.  Most of Venezuela's Jews are either first or second generation.

Venezuela was hospitable to Jewish life, and Jews "developed deep ties to the country and a strong sense of patriotism", acculturating and settling into a "comfortable 'live-and-let-live' rapport with the government".  According to David Harris, Executive Director of the American Jewish Committee: 
They have developed an impressive communal infrastructure built around a central umbrella organization, La Confederación de Asociaciones Israelitas de Venezuela (CAIV), with which the American Jewish Committee signed an association agreement last year, fifteen synagogues (all but one Orthodox), and, perhaps most striking of all, a Jewish all-in-one campus, Hebraica. Combining Jewish nursery and day schools, a country club, cultural center, a verdant setting, and wide-ranging sports activities, Hebraica serves as the focus for much of the community.

The results of these communal efforts speak for themselves. The community is close-knit, an overwhelming majority of Jewish children attend Jewish schools, the level of participation is high, identification with Israel is intense, and intermarriage rates are low compared to the United States or Britain.

What is equally striking in talking with Venezuela's Jews, to the extent that generalizations are ever possible, is an obvious pride in being Venezuelan. Not only do they continue to appreciate the refuge the country provided—the Jews having come in search of safety and opportunity — but they also recognize the country's postwar record of tolerance and relative absence of anti-Semitism, as well as its support of the 1947 UN resolution calling for the establishment of a Jewish state.

21st century

Emigration

According to the Latin American Jewish Congress, Venezuela's Jewish community had an estimated 22,000 people when Chávez took office in 1999. In the early 2000s, emigration of Venezuelan Jews to Israel grew steadily. The Algemeiner Journal stated that this emigration from Venezuela occurred due to "the country’s economic crisis ... as well as the anti-Semitic rhetoric that has marked the left-wing regime’s support for Iran, Syria, and Palestinian Islamist organizations like Hamas" and that "first Chavez and now Maduro have found political uses for anti-Jewish rhetoric".

By 2007, amid concerns of rising allegations of antisemitism,  emigration saw Venezuela's 20,000 Jewish population drop by 20% to 45%. For instance The Latin American Jewish Congress estimated that in 2007, only between 12,000 and 13,000 Jews still resided in Venezuela. By November 2010, more than 50% of Jewish Venezuelans had left the country since Chavez came to power, with some of those remaining behind complaining of "official antisemitism". By early 2013, only 9,000 Jews lived in Venezuela and in early 2015, it was reported that under 7,000 lived in the country.

Among destinations for the 15–16,000 Jews leaving Venezuela, the prime destination was The United States, particularly Miami. Others went to Israel, as well as to Panama, Colombia, Mexico, Costa Rica, and Guatemala.

With the Venezuelan economic crisis of the 2010s, Jewish emigration rapidly increased. This time they primarily moved to Israel, as the devaluation of their property and other assets effectively closed off other possibilities such as the United States and Panama.

Antisemitism

Antisemitism has occurred periodically throughout the history of Venezuela, including instances of anti-Jewish rioting in the 19th century and immigration restrictions in the early 20th, leading to a difficult assimilation for Jews in the country.

Since Hugo Chávez took power in 1999, there have been frequent accusations of antisemitism directed at the government.  Members of the World Jewish Congress and Simon Wiesenthal Center have portrayed comments from Chávez as antisemitic, including comparing other politicians to Hitler and the use of the phrase wandering Jews in reference to opposition leaders.  The Venezuelan Confederation of Israelite Associations also raised concerns that Chavez's rhetoric, which had "once clearly differentiated criticism of Israel from that of the Venezuelan Jewish community," had merged his anti-Zionist views with anti-Semitic ones beginning in 2004, while The Jewish Telegraphic Agency stated that Chavez's criticism of Israeli military actions during the 2006 Lebanon War was "fanning the flames of anti-Semitism." Chávez portrayed such accusations as propaganda.

Public instances of antisemitism have occurred as well.  An armed raid carried out by security forces in November on the Jewish elementary and high school in Caracas was described by the Stephen Roth Institute as "perhaps the most serious incident ever to have taken place in the history of the Jewish community."  The Institute also stated that pro-Chavez supporters were responsible for frequent antisemitic incidents such as desecrations of and attacks on synagogues and graffitied slogans such as "Jews go home."

Despite this, the United States Department of State stated in its 2005 report on International Religious Freedom that Venezuela is a "historically open society without significant anti-Semitism," while noting that "the Government and its supporters occasionally demonstrated possible anti-Semitism."  The Jewish Telegraphic Agency has said that antisemitic behavior was not typical for Venezuela.

See also 

Polish Venezuelan; mainly about Polish Jews immigrating to Venezuela
List of Venezuelan Jews
Israel–Venezuela relations
 History of the Jews in Curaçao

References